Braelinn is a neighborhood of Peachtree City, Georgia, United States. The village is centered at South Peachtree Parkway and Crosstown Road.

Shopping
 Braelinn Village Shopping Center Crosstown Road

 Wilshire Pavilion Highway 74 and Holly Grove Road

Populated places in Fayette County, Georgia